Billericay Rural District was a local government district in Essex, England from 1894 to 1934.

It consisted of the following parishes:

Basildon 
Brentwood (1894–1899; used to create Brentwood Urban District)
Bowers Gifford 
Childerditch
Downham
Dunton
East Horndon
Great Burstead 
Hutton 
Ingrave 
Laindon 
Lee Chapel 
Little Burstead 
Little Warley
Mountnessing
Nevendon 
North Benfleet 
Pitsea 
Ramsden Bellhouse
Ramsden Crays
Shenfield
South Weald 
Vange
West Horndon
Wickford

In 1934 the district was abolished. Hutton, Ingrave and South Weald went to Brentwood Urban District and most of the remainder went to Billericay Urban District with parts of some parishes (1,659 acres) transferred to Chelmsford Rural District.

References

Political history of Essex
Districts of England created by the Local Government Act 1894
Borough of Brentwood
Borough of Basildon
Rural districts of England